Anthony van der Eb (born 3 January 1813 – 21 September 1852) was a Dutch civil servant, who made a career in the administration on the Dutch Gold Coast.

Biography
Van der Eb was born in Rotterdam on 3 January 1813 to Hendrik van der Eb and Marianne Jacoba Lessueur. On 5 October 1833, he was installed as assistant, with the military rank of second lieutenant, to the Dutch Gold Coast. After Acting Commander Hendrik Tonneboeijer died during the Dutch–Ahanta War, the young Van der Eb became Acting Commander himself between 1837 and 1838. When major general Jan Verveer visited the Gold Coast to avenge the Ahanta and to reform the government of the colony, he wrote the following about Van der Eb:

Even though Verveer's report was not entirely positive, Van der Eb was installed as Governor of the Dutch Gold Coast by royal decree on 11 March 1840. He was licensed to conduct private trade in 1842 and quickly became the head agent for the Rotterdam firm of H. van Rijckevorsel and ordinary agent for the Amsterdam firm of J. Boelen & Co.

Van der Eb was granted leave for six months in 1846, and left the Gold Coast on 9 July. His leave was eventually extended until 31 March 1847, and he arrived back on the Gold Coast on 10 July of the said year.

On 7 November 1847, he sentenced the Elminese trader Adjua Gyapiaba to lifelong banishment in the East or West Indies for "serious calumnies and diatribes against the Dutch Government, the Elminese African government and the whole population of this place."

Van der Eb was requested by the Dutch government to compile a compendium of local laws and customs, a task which he delegated to a subordinate. The compendium was eventually submitted to the Ministry of Colonies in 1851. This work, which was subsequently published in 1931 in the Bijdragen tot de Taal-, Land- en Volkenkunde van Nederlandsch-Indië, has been an important source for social scientists on the Gold Coast societies.

Van der Eb died in office, on 21 September 1852, in Elmina Castle. He was buried in the Dutch cemetery of Elmina.

Personal life
Van der Eb married Efua Henrietta Huydecoper, daughter of Willem Huydecoper, a Euro-African civil servant for the Dutch government, who had acted as envoy of the Netherlands to the Ashanti Empire. After her death he remarried to Manza Henrietta Bartels, daughter of the prominent Euro-African merchant Carel Hendrik Bartels.

Decorations
Order of the Netherlands Lion (Knight)
Order of the Oak Crown (Commander)

Notes

References
 
 
 

1813 births
1852 deaths
Colonial governors of the Dutch Gold Coast
People from Rotterdam